The Ryde is a bus service that provides transportation to the Brigham Young University (BYU) community (including the Provo Missionary Training Center) in Provo, Utah, United States. The service is owned and operated by Student Movement, Inc. (SMI) and operates under the brand, "The Ryde". Although The Ryde began as a limited service paid shuttle bus, but the fall of 2015 it expanded to limited-service bus routes that are free to BYU students.

Description

The purpose of The Ryde's shuttle service is to help transport "thousands" of BYU students between the main campus of BYU and their off-campus housing. While the Utah Transit Authority (UTA) is the primary public transit service provider in Provo and along the Wasatch Front, the founders of The Ryde believed that UTA was not adequately addressing this transportation need. The growing success of The Ryde seems to support this supposition. The Ryde provides (nearly) direct shuttles from most of the major off-campus (and one on-campus) housing areas to the center of the BYU campus (closer than any UTA stops).

The Ryde's motto is The Ultimate BYU Shuttle Service and its website encouraged students to "Stop overpaying for gas, scraping your frozen windshield and fighting for parking spaces!"

In addition to its regular weekday service The Ryde also provides Saturday morning "Grocery Runs" that pick up passengers along the regular routes, but, instead of going to BYU campus, they go to Macey's grocery store before providing a return trip about forty minutes later. On-campus student housing complexes not included along regular routes are also served by the Grocery Runs.

Although The Ryde serves the BYU community, is authorized to drive buses on BYU property (for the exclusive purpose of picking up and dropping off authorized passengers), and SMI has (or has had) service contracts with both BYU and the Church of Jesus Christ of Latter-day Saints (LDS Church), SMI is not affiliated with either BYU or the LDS Church; and neither BYU nor the LDS Church have any interest in SMI

Destinations
The following housing areas and other miscellaneous destinations are served by The Ryde:

 Arcadia Apartments
 Belmont Condominiums
 Bountiful Court Apartments
 Branbury Apartments
 Brittany Apartments
 Brookview Apartments
 Brownstone Condominiums
 Carriage Cove Apartments
 Centennial Apartments
 Centennial II Apartments
 College Park Apartments
 Continental Apartments
 The Crestwood Apartments
 Fleur-de-Lis Apartments
 Foxwood Apartments & Condominiums
 Helaman Halls (Saturday only)
 Heritage Halls (Saturday only)
 King Henry Apartments
 Liberty Square Apartments
 LeGrande Apartments
 Macey's (Saturday only)
 Manavu Condominiums
 Nelson Apartments
 Old Mill Condominiums
 Omni Condominiums
 Provo Recreation Center
 Raintree Commons Apartments
 Roman Garden Apartments
 Southridge Apartments
 Sparks II Apartments
 Summerhays Apartments
 Union Square Apartments
 Utah Valley Regional Medical Center
 The Village at South Campus
 White House
 Winfield Apartments
 Wyview Park

Rates
As of the Fall 2015 Semester (August 2015) The Ryde is free to all BYU students, faculty, and other employees with their BYU ID. Prior to the fall of 2015, students could purchase a pass for $99.00 per semester or $179.00 per school year (fall and winter semesters). In addition, some apartment complexes subsidized their residents' passes such that they could be purchases for $79.00 per semester. (By comparison, a UTA pass cost $212.00 per semester, but it included access to all of UTA's service area along the Wasatch Front.)

History

Origins
Since at least 2002, BYU provided students (and often faculty and other employees) the opportunity for either free or substantially subsidized UTA bus passes of one form or another. However, in the fall of 2010, BYU announced that beginning with the Fall 2011 Semester, it would dramatically reduced the amount allotted to UTA pass subsidies. The result was that even with the continued nominal subsidy, there was a dramatic increase in the cost of a UTA pass for students.

In mid-2011, BYU announced that beginning with the Winter 2012 Semester, Student Movement, Inc. (SMI) would begin transporting students between certain off-campus housing units and BYU campus. SMI was founded earlier that year by two BYU seniors (Jake Luekenga and Kevin Smith) who believed there was a need for a more specialized service than UTA provided. (While the UTA passes offered access throughout the UTA service area, many of the students used it almost exclusively to travel to and from BYU campus.) Although earnest discussions with the BYU Administration had begun in March, it took until June to reach a firm agreement with BYU and have it signed. (A contract was necessary as SMI would be partially operating on the privately owned campus of BYU.) As soon as the agreement was executed, SMI ordered three buses. The used buses ordered by SMI were similar in size to the  buses utilized by UTA, but would use cleaner burning compressed natural gas (CNG) for fuel, rather than diesel fuel (as used by most of those owned by UTA at the time). Accordingly, Mr. Luekenga claimed, their buses would have 50 percent lower emissions. Another advantage of the new service (over UTA's routes) is that the shuttles would connected directly with the center of BYU campus.

Plans for new shuttle included service to three areas: the King Henry area (southeast of campus), the Alpine Village and Glenwood area (west-northwest of campus), and the Raintree and Wyview Park area (northwest of campus). The single on-campus stop was (as designated by BYU) initially adjacent to the Museum of Art. SMI also indicated that plans included Saturday morning "grocery runs". The cost for the new service was set at $99.00 per semester, but residents of the Glenwood and Raintree complexes would have their passes subsidized such that their cost would be $79.00 per semester. Even before it began service, SMI hoped to expand it service beyond the three destination areas, particularly the Carriage Cove and Branbury area.

Paid service
Just over a year after The Ryde began service, BYU announced that it would be permanently closing most of East Campus Drive and the eastern end of North Campus Drive. Even though the closures would be in phases, the first phase would begin in May (following the end of the Winter 2013 Semester) and would include closing East Campus Drive between 1100 North and Heritage Drive. As a result of this closure access to the Museum of Art stop for the shuttle coming from the southeast (King Henry) was no longer feasible, so its on-campus stop moved to a location immediately east of the Crabtree Technology Building on East Campus Drive (just southeast of the Wilkinson Student Center). However, this same closure also moved the UTA stop/transfer location (UTA's stop closest to the center of campus) from immediately east of the Wilkinson Student Center (on East Campus Drive) to the perimeter of campus at about 800 East 900 North. The end result of these changes was that The Ryde could continue picking up and dropping off students  closer that any UTA stop (depending on the direction of approach to the campus).

By the fall of 2013, an additional route was added to serve the Wymount Terrace on-campus married student housing complex. In October 2013, The Digital Universe reported that missionaries at the temporary west campus of the Missionary Training Center ("MTC West"), which opened in early 2013, were utilizing limited shuttle service provided by Student Movement (The Ryde). Primarily The Ryde transported the missionaries between the main MTC campus, the Provo Temple, and sometimes the Marriott Center. The MTC discontinued the use of the temporary west campus by the end of 2014.

Free service
In December 2014 BYU announced that beginning with the Fall 2015 Semester most of The Ryde's routes would be enhanced and would be free to all BYU students, faculty, and other employees with their BYU ID. However, the shuttle route that previously ran to Wymount Terrace would be eliminated. Also included in the announcement, BYU indicated that it would begin charging students to park in most of the on-campus lots that had been previously free to students. BYU anticipated that the new $60.00 parking fee would cover the cost of The Ryde's shuttle service. However, since The Ryde does not operate during the spring and summer term, parking in all the student lots will still be free during that time of year. BYU stated that the changes were intended to "incentivize" students to utilized other transportation options instead of their cars. The Ryde's shuttle service eliminates the time that many students spend parking and then walking to the various parts of campus.

Early on plans for the free service included a continuation of the stop near The Lodges at Glenwood Apartments on Route 1. (The stop also served the Alpine Village, Cambridge Court Apartments, Cinnamon Tree Apartments, and Riviera Apartments). However, this stop was eventually dropped from route along with service to these complexes. The route that served Wymount Terrace (which ran through 2014) was also dropped from plans for The Ryde's free service (primarily due to low ridership). However, some Wymount residents have petitioned to reinstate this service. In support of their petition, the students indicate that this route would also provide service for all students to the Student Health Center.

Routes
In addition to the regular routes, The Ryde also provides "Saturday Grocery Runs" to Macey's in north Provo. Regular (weekday) service is provided from about 7:30 am to about 9:00 pm Monday through Thursday and from about 7:30 am to about 6:00 pm on Fridays during the fall and winter semesters, but not on school holidays (when school is not in session). During peak times (7:00 am to 10:00 am and 3:00 pm to 6:00 pm) the shuttles run every 15 to 20 minutes. The Saturday "Grocery Runs" pick up (depending on the destination) at 9:00-9:50 am and leave Macey's at 9:50-10:40 am (again, depending on the destination).

See also

 Brigham Young University
 Brigham Young University Museum of Art
 Campus of Brigham Young University
 Ernest L. Wilkinson Student Center
 Missionary Training Center
 Provo Orem MAX
 Utah Transit Authority
 Utah Valley Regional Medical Center

Notes

References

External links

 

Bus transportation in Utah
2011 establishments in Utah
Provo, Utah
Transportation in Utah County, Utah
Brigham Young University